The Capitol Park Museum is a branch of the Louisiana State Museum located at 660 N. 4th Street, Baton Rouge, Louisiana.

There are two permanent exhibits on the history and culture of Louisiana. The building was designed by New Orleans-based design studio Eskew Dumez Ripple and exhibits were created by Christopher Chadbourne & Associates.

Notable objects include the Bayou St. John submarine and Louis Armstrong's childhood bugle.

References

External links

 Louisiana State Museum - Baton Rouge

Museums in Baton Rouge, Louisiana
History museums in Louisiana
Atchafalaya National Heritage Area
Louisiana State Museum
Tourist attractions in Baton Rouge, Louisiana